Star Carol is a Christmas carol composed by John Rutter in 1972 and published by Oxford University Press.

References

Christmas carols
Compositions by John Rutter